Bukovica is a village in central Croatia, in the municipality of Topusko, Sisak-Moslavina County.

Demographics
According to the 2011 census, the village of Bukovica has 2 inhabitants. This represents 2.47% of its pre-war population according to the 1991 census.

The 1991 census recorded that 97.53% of the village population were ethnic Serbs (79/81), 1.23% were ethnic Croats (1/81), and 1.23% were of other ethnic origin (1/81).

Sights
 Monument to the uprising of the people of Kordun and Banija

See also 
 Glina massacres

References

Populated places in Sisak-Moslavina County
Serb communities in Croatia